are a Japanese rock band formed in 1986. They are one of the foremost Japanese mod bands, and have enjoyed a long-running career spanning 25 studio albums. In 2017, they played a one-man concert at the Nippon Budokan arena to mark their 30th anniversary.

Their music has also been featured in the popular anime series Kochira Katsushika-ku Kameari Kōen-mae Hashutsujo and Dragon Ball Super.

Members
  – vocals, songwriting
  – guitar
  – bass
  – drums

Former members
  – drums (1986–1991)
  – bass (1991–2014)
  – drums (1986–1991)
  – bass (1986–1991)
  – guitar (1986)
  – bass (1986)

Discography
 Main albums

References

External links
 – official site 
 – Columbia Records' official site 
 – official site of podcast "Ikebukuro Ko-saten Nijyu-yoji" 

Japanese rock music groups
Musical groups established in 1986
Musical quartets
Musical groups from Tokyo
Nippon Columbia artists